Naomi Young (born 25 March 1976) is an Australian synchronized swimmer who competed in the 2000 Summer Olympics.

She competed at the 1998 Commonwealth Games, winning a silver medal in the duet event, and at the 2002 Commonwealth Games where she won bronze medals in the duet and solo events.

References

1976 births
Living people
Australian synchronised swimmers
Olympic synchronised swimmers of Australia
Synchronized swimmers at the 2000 Summer Olympics
Commonwealth Games medallists in synchronised swimming
Commonwealth Games silver medallists for Australia
Commonwealth Games bronze medallists for Australia
Synchronised swimmers at the 1998 Commonwealth Games
Synchronised swimmers at the 2002 Commonwealth Games
Medallists at the 1998 Commonwealth Games
Medallists at the 2002 Commonwealth Games